Salvation Town is the debut album from Jonny Wickersham, guitarist for punk band Social Distortion. The album was released on April 1, 2014. The producer of the album was Dave Kalish, a long-time friend and collaborator of Jonny's.

References

2014 albums
Americana albums